Iván Sánchez (born November 19, 1974 in Móstoles, Madrid, Spain) is a Spanish actor, model and film producer.

Career
After his time as a model, Sánchez started acting in 2002 in his home country doing cinema, television, and theater. His first starring role was in the 2005 television series, El auténtico Rodrigo Leal as Rodrigo Leal. That series was a satire of Big Brother and similar reality shows. His big break came a year later when he was offered the role of Dr. Raul Lara in the series Hospital Central. Sánchez also acted in movies including Besos de gato (2003).

In March 2011, Sánchez left Hospital Central to join La Reina del Sur and later for the second season of Hispania, la leyenda.

In 2013, he starred as the antagonist opposite William Levy and Ximena Navarrete in Televisa's La tempestad. This was his first telenovela in Mexico. A year later, he appeared as a special guest on the second season of the series Crossing Lines where he played the reporter Mateo Cruz.

In 2015, Sánchez acted in Señorita Polvora. He landed another protagonist telenovela role in, Lo imperdonable beating out Jencarlos Canela for the role. He acted opposite Ana Brenda Contreras.

Personal life
Starting in 2005, Sánchez was in a longtime relationship with his Hospital General co-star Elia Galera. They had two daughters, before ending their relationship in 2011. They reconciled in 2013 and married in 2014. It was revealed in 2016 that he and Galera had separated again.

Filmography

Films

Television

References

External links
 Web site

 

1974 births
Male actors from Madrid
Spanish male film actors
Spanish male telenovela actors
Spanish male television actors
Spanish male models
Spanish emigrants to Mexico
Living people
Naturalized citizens of Mexico